Five-O is the thirty-eighth studio album by American musician Hank Williams Jr. It was released by Warner Bros. Records on April 29, 1985. "I'm for Love," "This Ain't Dallas" and "Ain't Misbehavin'" were released as singles, reaching No. 1, No. 4 and No. 1 on the Billboard Hot Country Singles chart. The album reached No. 1 on the Top Country Albums chart, becoming his second No. 1 album, and has been certified Gold by the RIAA.

Along with its commercial success, Five-O garnered a great deal of recognition within the music industry. The Academy of Country Music nominated Five-O for Album of the Year and Williams for Top Male Vocalist. The Country Music Association also nominated Williams for Male Vocalist of the Year. At the 1987 Grammy Awards, Williams was nominated for Best Country Vocal Performance, Male for his version of "Ain't Misbehavin'".

Track listing

Personnel
Ray Barrickman - bass guitar
Matt Betton - drums
Dean Bradley - acoustic guitar
Emory Gordy Jr. - bass guitar
Paul Hatfield - Fender Rhodes, keyboards
John Hobbs - keyboards
John Barlow Jarvis - keyboards
"Cowboy" Eddie Long - pedal steel guitar
Bill Marshall - drums
Jerry McKinney - soprano saxophone, tenor saxophone
Terry McMillan - synare on "I'm for Love"
Edgar Meyer - acro bass on "Ain't Misbehavin'"
Lamar Morris - acoustic guitar, electric guitar
Steve Schaffer - synclavier on "Outlaw's Reward"
Randy Scruggs - acoustic guitar
George Thorogood - electric guitar and slide guitar on "I Really Like Girls"
Wayne Turner - electric guitar
Wendy Waldman - background vocals on "Something to Believe In"
Billy Joe Walker Jr. - acoustic guitar, electric guitar
Hank Williams Jr. - electric guitar, lead vocals
Reggie Young - electric guitar

Charts

Weekly charts

Year-end charts

References

1985 albums
Albums produced by Jimmy Bowen
Hank Williams Jr. albums
Warner Records albums